Georgios Manolakis (born 28 May 2000) is a Greek professional footballer who plays as a left-back for Super League 2 club Almopos Aridea.

Honours
SSV Ulm
Württemberg Cup: 2017–18

References

2000 births
Living people
Greek footballers
Greece youth international footballers
Greek expatriate footballers
Regionalliga players
Football League (Greece) players
SSV Ulm 1846 players
FC Memmingen players
Diagoras F.C. players
Association football defenders
Sportspeople from the South Aegean
People from Rhodes